Neureuther is a family surname. 

People with the surname include:

Christian Neureuther (born 1949), German World Cup alpine ski racer
Eugen Napoleon Neureuther (1806–1882), German painter, etcher and illustrator
Felix Neureuther (born 1984), German World Cup alpine ski racer
Günther Neureuther (born 1955), German former judoka
Rosi Mittermaier-Neureuther (1950–2023), German female alpine skier

German toponymic surnames